The Commercial Single was released to promote The Commercial Album by the Residents.  It was released only in the United Kingdom and, despite being called a single, included eight songs: six songs from the album and two (unlisted) bonus tracks, all clocking in at one minute. In France, Celluloid Records issued only the two hidden tracks, correctly titled, as an independent single.

Track listing

Side A 
 Amber
 Red Rider
 Picnic Boy
 Shut Up Shut Up (hidden)

Side B 
 When We Were Young
 Phantom
 Moisture
 And I Was Alone (hidden)

1980 EPs
The Residents albums